The sharpnose leaf-toed gecko (Hemidactylus oxyrhinus) is a species of gecko. It is endemic to Abd al Kuri in the Socotra archipelago.

References

Hemidactylus
Reptiles described in 1899
Reptiles of the Middle East
Endemic fauna of Socotra
Taxa named by George Albert Boulenger